Allen Willard Engel (born October 20, 1932) is a farmer and former political figure in Saskatchewan, Canada. He represented Notukeu-Willow Bunch from 1971 to 1975 and Assiniboia-Gravelbourg from 1978 to 1986 in the Legislative Assembly of Saskatchewan as a New Democratic Party (NDP) member.

He was born in Gravelbourg, Saskatchewan, the son of Emil Engel. Engel studied at the Saskatchewan Teacher's College and taught school for several years. In 1955, he married Joyce Beverly Baumbach of Lodi, California. Engel ran unsuccessfully in the newly created Assiniboia-Gravelbourg riding in 1975 before being elected again in 1978.

Engel survived the Progressive Conservative landslide in 1982, almost certainly because Liberal leader Ralph Goodale ran in the riding, turning the contest into a three-way race in the process. However, Engel was defeated by Goodale when he ran for reelection to the assembly in 1986 and was defeated again by John Thomas Wolfe in a 1988 by-election held after Goodale ran for a federal seat. Engel served as the Legislative Secretary to the Minister of Agriculture from 1978 - 1982, and Agriculture Critic from 1982 - 1986. During his tenure, Engel was instrumental in the preservation of the Grasslands National Park in Southern Saskatchewan, home to some of the world's oldest varieties of virgin prairie. Engel also focussed his efforts on international development including supervising Saskatchewan matching grants for agricultural growth in Africa, and later serving on international development boards. A street in Regina, Saskatchewan was named to honour his service to the province in 2002.

References 

Saskatchewan New Democratic Party MLAs
1932 births
Living people
People from Gravelbourg, Saskatchewan